Tillandsia virescens is a plant species in the genus Tillandsia. This species is native to Argentina, Bolivia, Chile and Peru. It was first described in 1802.

References

virescens
Flora of Argentina
Flora of Bolivia
Flora of Chile
Flora of Peru
Plants described in 1802